The Miraj - Castlerock  Express is an important train belonging to South western Railway zone that runs between  of Maharashtra and  Karnataka in India. It is currently being operated with 17333/17334 train numbers on a daily basis.

Service
The 22145/Pandharpur–Miraj Superfast Express has an average speed of 55 km/hr and covers 137 km in 2h 29m. The 22146/Miraj–Pandharpur Superfast Express has an average speed of 55 km/hr and covers 137 km in 2h 29m.

Route and halts 
The important halts of the train are:

Coach composition
The train has standard ICF rakes with max speed of 110 kmph. The train consists of 11 coaches:

 9 General Unreserved
 2 Seating cum Luggage Rake

Traction
Both trains are hauled by a Pune Loco Shed-based WDM-3A diesel locomotive from Castlerock to Miraj and vice versa.

Direction reversal
The train shares its rake with 17331/17332 Miraj–Hubballi Express.

See also 
 Pandharpur railway station
 Miraj Junction railway station
 Miraj–Hubballi Express

Notes

References

External links 
 22145/Pandharpur–Miraj SF Express India Rail Info
 22146/Miraj–Pandharpur SF Express India Rail Info

Express trains in India
Rail transport in Maharashtra